Anness is an unincorporated community in Sedgwick County, Kansas, United States, about 4.75 miles west of Viola, between W 111th St S and W 119th St S, and between S 327th St W and S 343rd St W.

History
Anness had its start by the building of the Atchison, Topeka and Santa Fe Railway through that territory. The original owner of the site named the town in honor of his wife, Ann S. Wilson.

Anness was founded in the 1880s by WH Wilson, in what is now Sedgwick County. The first post office in Anness was established in February 1887.

Education
The community is served by Kingman–Norwich USD 331 public school district.

References

Further reading

External links
 Sedgwick County maps: Current, Historic, KDOT

Unincorporated communities in Sedgwick County, Kansas
Unincorporated communities in Kansas